Ivan Huklek (born 12 November 1996) is a Croatian Greco-Roman wrestler.

Career 
In 2017, Huklek won the silver medal at the 2017 World U23 Wrestling Championship in Bydgoszcz in the 85 kg category. In 2018, he won the silver medal in the men's 87 kg event at the 2018 European U23 Wrestling Championship held in Istanbul, Turkey. Huklek obtained one of the remaining slots in the men's Greco-Roman 87 kg at the 2021 World Qualification Tournament in Sofia, Bulgaria.

References

External links
 

1996 births
Living people
Croatian male sport wrestlers
Competitors at the 2018 Mediterranean Games
Wrestlers at the 2019 European Games
Olympic wrestlers of Croatia
Wrestlers at the 2020 Summer Olympics
European Games competitors for Croatia
21st-century Croatian people